Pangil Ahmed Kutty (1888 - 1946), title Musliyar, was an Islamic scholar from Pangu in Malabar District, Madras Presidency.

Ahmed Kutty was born to Nur ud-Din and Pazhedathu Vayottil Thithu in Malabar District. After the initial religious education in Kerala, he joined the al-Baqiyat at Vellore for higher studies.

He co-founded the Samastha Kerala Jamiyyathul Ulama, the principal Sunni-Shafi'i scholarly body in northern Kerala, in 1926.

References

Indian Islamic religious leaders
1946 deaths
20th-century Muslim scholars of Islam
Kerala Sunni-Shafi'i scholars
1888 births
Malayali people
Shafi'is
Islam in Kerala
Indian Sunni Muslim scholars of Islam